Radu Motreanu (born 22 June 1998) is a Romanian professional footballer who plays as a defender. He played for the Romania U-17 team between 2012 and 2016.

Early life
Radu Motreanu was born and raised in Timișoara, Timiș County of Romania. He is the only son of Dana Motreanu (b. 1968).  He began his football career as a junior at Poli Timișoara at an early age and grew up inside the team until he was moved to the senior team in 2015. He attended the local Sports High-School of Timișoara where he graduated in 2017. He is currently a student at the West University of Timișoara in Sports specialization. He is a good friend of the Romanian gymnast Diana Bulimar.

References

External links
 

1998 births
Living people
Sportspeople from Timișoara
Romanian footballers
Association football defenders
Romania youth international footballers
Liga II players
Liga III players
ACS Poli Timișoara players
SSU Politehnica Timișoara players
CSC Dumbrăvița players